Keep Your Cool is the third solo album by desert rocker Brant Bjork. It is full of soul/funk influenced simply written songs with laid back beats and tongue-in-cheek lyrics throughout.

Track listing

Credits
Produced by: Brant Bjork & Dave Raphael

Recorded by: Dave Raphael @ Glide on Fade

Mastered by: Schneebie @ Kling St.

All Songs/Music written and performed by Brant Bjork

Management: Denise DeVitto

Back Photo: Denise DeVitto

Cover art: Bunker/Bjork for DUNArt Layout

Notes
In many live performances, Brant Bjork and the Bros have been known to perform an extended jam of the song "I Miss My Chick" and lead into a cover of Cream's "Sunshine of Your Love" or Gary Numan's "Cars".
The album was remastered and re-released in 2019 with new artwork on Bjork's current label, Heavy Psych Sounds.

References 

Brant Bjork albums
2003 albums